Sebastián Luna (born 25 December 1987) is an Argentine professional footballer who plays as a midfielder for Torneo Federal A for Boca Unidos.

He was born in General Belgrano, Buenos Aires.

References

External links
 Profile at BDFA 
 

1987 births
Living people
Argentine footballers
Argentine expatriate footballers
Association football midfielders
Sportspeople from Buenos Aires Province
Quilmes Atlético Club footballers
San Lorenzo de Almagro footballers
Rangers de Talca footballers
Club Universitario de Deportes footballers
Club Atlético Sarmiento footballers
Club Atlético Belgrano footballers
Boca Unidos footballers
Primera Nacional players
Chilean Primera División players
Argentine Primera División players
Argentine expatriate sportspeople in Chile
Expatriate footballers in Chile